Megabiston is a monotypic moth genus in the family Geometridae described by Warren in 1894. Its only species, Megabiston plumosaria, first described by John Henry Leech in 1891, is found in Japan.

References

Bistonini